Mario Rafael Díaz-Balart Caballero (born September 25, 1961) is an American politician serving as the U.S. representative for Florida's 26th congressional district.  A Republican, he was elected in 2002, and his district includes much of southwestern Miami-Dade County, including Hialeah, and much of the northern portion of the Everglades.

After Representative Alcee Hastings's death in April 2021, Díaz-Balart became the dean (or longest-serving member) of Florida's congressional delegation.

Early life, education, and early political career
Díaz-Balart was born in 1961 in Fort Lauderdale, to Cuban parents, the late Cuban politician Rafael Díaz-Balart, and his wife, Hilda Caballero Brunet.

He is a member of the Díaz-Balart family: His aunt, Mirta Díaz-Balart, was the first wife of Cuban president Fidel Castro. Her son, and his cousin, was Fidel Ángel "Fidelito" Castro Díaz-Balart. His uncle is the Cuban-Spanish painter Waldo Díaz-Balart. His brother Lincoln Díaz-Balart represented Florida's 21st District from 1993 to 2011. He has two other brothers, José Díaz-Balart, a journalist, and Rafael Díaz-Balart, a banker.

He studied political science at the University of South Florida before beginning his public service career as an aide to then-Miami Mayor Xavier Suárez in 1985. In the same year, he changed his political party affiliation from Democratic to Republican.

Florida legislature

Díaz-Balart was elected to the Florida House in 1988 and to the Florida Senate in 1992. He returned to the Florida House in 2000.

U.S. House of Representatives

Elections
2002–2006
Díaz-Balart gave up his seat in the state house to run in the newly created 25th District, which included most of western Miami-Dade County, part of Collier County and the mainland portion of Monroe County. He won with 64% of the vote. He was unopposed for reelection in 2004, and won a third term with 58% of the vote in 2006.

2008

In 2008, Díaz-Balart faced his strongest challenge to date in Joe García, former executive director of the Cuban American National Foundation and former chairman of the Miami-Dade County Democratic Party. Díaz-Balart defeated Garcia with 53% of the vote.

2010

On February 11, 2010, Díaz-Balart announced his intention to seek election in Florida's 21st congressional district—being vacated by his brother, Lincoln Díaz-Balart—rather than the 25th district. Unlike the 25th, the 21st has long been considered the Miami area's most Republican district. No other party even fielded a candidate when filing closed on April 30, handing Díaz-Balart the seat.

2012

Díaz-Balart was reelected unopposed in 2012 in the renumbered 25th district.

2014

In 2014, Díaz-Balart ran unopposed.

2016

In 2016, Díaz-Balart beat Democrat Alina Valdes, 62.4% to 37.6%. It was only the third time that a Democrat had filed to run in this district, which had been numbered as the 21st from 1993 to 2013.

2018

The Miami Herald reported in April 2018 that Díaz-Balart seemed a shoo-in for reelection in November. Former Hialeah mayor Raúl Martínez, a Democrat who had challenged Lincoln Díaz-Balart in what was the 21st in 2008, said the 25th district "is very hard to win for a Democrat, especially if you're not Hispanic and you don't speak Spanish." Valdes, who had lost to him in 2016, was a candidate in the Democratic primary. In April, Annisa Karim, who is active in the Democratic Party, announced that she too would run in the primary. In May, the Herald reported that Mary Barzee Flores, a former judge who had at first decided to run in the 27th district, had opted instead to run for Díaz-Balart's seat.

In the November 2018 general election, Díaz-Balart defeated Barzee Flores, 60.5% to 39.5%.

Committee assignments
 Committee on Appropriations
 Subcommittee on Defense
 Subcommittee on State, Foreign Operations, and Related Programs
 Subcommittee on Transportation, Housing and Urban Development, and Related Agencies (Ranking Member)

Caucus memberships
 Chair of the Congressional Hispanic Conference
 Founder of the Protecting Families Online Initiative
 Founding member of the Washington Waste Watchers
 Member of the Congressional Cuba Democracy Caucus
 Republican Main Street Partnership
 House Baltic Caucus
Republican Governance Group

Political positions
As of January 2018, Díaz-Balart had voted with his party in 92.4% of votes in the 115th United States Congress and voted in line with President Trump's position in 93.1% of votes.

He is a founding member of the Congressional Hispanic Conference, a caucus of Hispanic Republican congressmen.

LGBT rights 
In May 2019, Díaz-Balart voted to prohibit discrimination on the basis of sexual orientation and gender identity in employment, housing, public accommodations, public education, federal funding, credit, and the jury system under the Equality Act. He joined seven other Republicans and 228 Democrats in supporting the legislation, which passed the United States House of Representatives during the 116th Congress.

In February 2021, Díaz-Balart changed his position on the legislation, voting against it during the 117th Congress on the basis that it did not protect individuals or organizations who oppose LGBTQ rights. In a statement released after his vote, he claimed Democrats ignored Republicans' issues with the bill and "doubled down on some of the most troubling issues, including sabotaging religious freedom."

In 2021, Díaz-Balart co-sponsored the Fairness for All Act, the Republican alternative to the Equality Act. The bill would prohibit discrimination on the basis of sex, sexual orientation, and gender identity, and protect the free exercise of religion.

In 2015, Díaz-Balart was one of 60 Republicans voting to uphold President Barack Obama's 2014 executive order banning federal contractors from making hiring decisions that discriminate based on sexual orientation or gender identity.

In 2016, Díaz-Balart was one of 43 Republicans to vote for the Maloney Amendment to H.R. 5055 which would prohibit the use of funds for government contractors who discriminate against LGBT employees.

On July 19, 2022, Díaz-Balart and 46 other Republican Representatives voted for the Respect for Marriage Act, which would codify the right to same-sex marriage in federal law. However, Díaz-Balart voted against final passage on December 8, 2022.

Vote Smart issue positions
According to Vote Smart's 2016 analysis, Díaz-Balart generally supports pro-life legislation, opposes an income tax increase, opposes mandatory minimum sentences for nonviolent drug offenders, opposes federal spending as a means of promoting economic growth, supports lowering taxes as a means of promoting economic growth, opposes requiring states to adopt federal education standards, supports building the Keystone Pipeline, supports government funding for the development of renewable energy, opposes the federal regulation of greenhouse gas emissions, opposes gun-control legislation, supports repealing the Affordable Care Act, opposes requiring immigrants who are unlawfully present to return to their country of origin before they are eligible for citizenship, opposes same-sex marriage, and supports allowing individuals to divert a portion of their Social Security taxes into personal retirement accounts.

Environment 
In 2007, Díaz-Balart said, "I know there's a lot of money to be made on the bandwagon of global warming. You can make movies, documentaries, get a lot of research money — and that's okay, I love capitalism...My fear is using the bandwagon of global warming to have Congress act on some knee-jerk reaction which will please some editorialists, will hurt our economy, will not do anything to help us in the future."

As of January 2018, Díaz-Balart was not a member of the bipartisan Climate Solutions Caucus.

Health care 
On May 4, 2017, Díaz-Balart voted to repeal the Patient Protection and Affordable Care Act (Obamacare) and pass the American Health Care Act.

Donald Trump
In February 2017, Díaz-Balart voted against a resolution that would have directed the House to request 10 years of Trump's tax returns, which would then have been reviewed by the House Ways and Means Committee in a closed session.

Díaz-Balart supported Donald Trump's firing of FBI Director James Comey, saying, "It is clear that Director Comey had lost the confidence of the deputy attorney general, attorney general, and the president. Unfortunately, he became a controversial and divisive figure."

In January 2018, after it was reported that Trump had voiced his opposition to immigration from Haiti, El Salvador, and African countries—which he reportedly called "shithole countries"—in a meeting on immigration reform, Díaz-Balart, who attended the meeting, did not say whether the alleged incident took place.

In December 2020, Díaz-Balart was one of 126 Republican members of the House of Representatives to sign an amicus brief in support of Texas v. Pennsylvania, a lawsuit filed at the United States Supreme Court contesting the results of the 2020 presidential election, in which Joe Biden defeated Trump. The Supreme Court declined to hear the case on the basis that Texas lacked standing under Article III of the Constitution to challenge the results of an election held by another state.

House Speaker Nancy Pelosi issued a statement that called signing the amicus brief an act of "election subversion." She also reprimanded Díaz-Balart and the other House members who supported the lawsuit: "The 126 Republican Members that signed onto this lawsuit brought dishonor to the House. Instead of upholding their oath to support and defend the Constitution, they chose to subvert the Constitution and undermine public trust in our sacred democratic institutions." New Jersey Representative Bill Pascrell, citing section three of the 14th Amendment, called for Pelosi to not seat Díaz-Balart and the other Republicans who signed the brief supporting the suit, arguing that "the text of the 14th Amendment expressly forbids Members of Congress from engaging in rebellion against the United States. Trying to overturn a democratic election and install a dictator seems like a pretty clear example of that." On January 6, 2021, Diaz-Balart was among a group of legislators who voted against certification of the United States Electoral College vote count despite no evidence of widespread voter fraud.

Committee membership
On February 4, 2021, Díaz-Balart voted with 10 other Republican House members and all voting Democrats to strip Marjorie Taylor Greene of her House Education and Labor Committee and House Budget Committee assignments in response to controversial political statements she had made.

Economic issues
On September 29, 2008, Díaz-Balart voted against the Emergency Economic Stabilization Act of 2008, which was intended to purchase distressed assets and supply cash directly to banks during the global financial crisis of 2008.

Díaz-Balart voted to promote free trade with Peru, against assisting workers who lose jobs due to globalization, for the Central America Free Trade Agreement, for the US-Australia Free Trade Agreement, for the US-Singapore free trade agreement, and for free trade with Chile. He was rated 75% by the National Foreign Trade Council, indicating support for trade engagement.

Tax reform
Díaz-Balart voted for the Tax Cuts and Jobs Act of 2017. The Center for American Progress, a center-left think-tank, estimated that 41,000 of his constituents would lose their health insurance as a result of the bill's passing.

Foreign policy

Cuba
In 2007, Díaz-Balart advocated maintaining the Cuban embargo, saying, "Some people do not understand the embargo of Cuba. Its purpose is to keep American hard currency out of the hands of a Communist thug by restricting most trade and travel."

In an April 2015 essay for Time magazine, Díaz-Balart wrote that President Obama "continues to appease brutal dictatorships while gaining precious little in return. He conflates the Cuban dictatorship with the Cuban people when in reality, their interests are diametrically opposed." Díaz-Balart noted that "all eight Cuban-American senators and congressmen from both sides of the aisle strongly disagree" with Obama's policy on Cuba, whose people "want to gather peacefully, speak their minds, practice their faiths, access the Internet, and enjoy the fruits of their labor."

In September 2016, Díaz-Balart praised Republican presidential candidate Donald Trump "for firmly stating his commitment today to reverse President Obama's capitulations to the Castro regime" and contrasted Trump's position to what he called Hillary Clinton's "foolhardy stance." The U.S., he said, needs "a president who once again will stand with the Cuban people instead of emboldening and enriching their oppressors."

In a March 2017 memo to the Trump White House, Díaz-Balart argued that if the Cuban government did not conform to the Helms-Burton law within 90 days, the U.S. should revert to its pre-Obama policy on Cuba.

On January 19, 2023, Diaz-Balart said he supported sanctioning and revoking the visas of members of the Honduran government if the legislative body voted to remove Honduras from CAFTA. He was the first U.S. lawmaker to threaten to revoke the visas of members of Xiomara Castro's government.

Falklands
Díaz-Balart has strongly supported the right of self-determination on the Falkland Islands, over which there is a sovereignty dispute between Argentina and the United Kingdom. On April 18, 2013, he introduced a House resolution calling on the federal government to officially recognize the result of the 2013 Falkland Islands sovereignty referendum in which the Falkland Islanders overwhelmingly voted to remain a British Overseas Territory. Díaz-Balart introduced a similar resolution in 2017, recognizing the result of that year's general election in the Falklands.

Immigration and refugees 
In 2014, the Washington Post reported that Díaz-Balart was "eagerly seeking a deal" on undocumented immigrants "that can somehow please enough Republicans and Democrats to advance. And that upsets many Democrats and Republicans." After being "involved in bipartisan talks on the issue for years", he was "one of the guys most skilled on the issue" and hence "gets plenty of flack from both sides." Díaz-Balart told the Post that "President Obama said that this was going to be one of his first priorities in his first 12 months", but even when "Democrats controlled everything", nothing got done "because they didn't want to do it."

Díaz-Balart supported Trump's 2017 executive order to impose a temporary ban on entry to the U.S. to citizens of seven Muslim-majority countries, saying, "The ban is only temporary until the administration can review and enact the necessary procedures to vet immigrants from these countries. The ban is based on countries the Obama administration identified as 'countries of concern' and not based on a religious test."

He took part in a January 2018 White House meeting about DACA, and said that nothing would "divert my focus to stop the deportation of these innocent people whose futures are at stake."

Gun policy 
In the aftermath of the Stoneman Douglas High School shooting on February 14, 2018, in Parkland, Florida, Díaz-Balart said gun control legislation would not be effective at stopping mass shootings, saying, "I want to make sure we look at things that could make a difference."

Drug policy
Díaz-Balart has a "D" rating from NORML for his voting history regarding cannabis-related causes.

Espionage
Díaz-Balart took part in a November 2013 meeting between American legislators and the European Parliament's foreign affairs committee about NSA spying on European officials. He told his European counterparts that they should realize that the U.S. is their greatest ally. "Part of re-establishing trust", he said, "is to know who your friends are and treat them accordingly, and to know who your enemies are and treat them accordingly."

Infrastructure
A 2017 report found that Díaz-Balart had delivered millions to his district for road and highway improvements.

Personal life
Díaz-Balart lives in Miami with his wife, Tia, and their son, Cristian Rafael.

On March 18, 2020, Díaz-Balart announced he had tested positive for COVID-19. He was the first member of Congress to do so. Recovering from the effects of the disease, though still drained from the experience, Diaz-Balart said he would offer his blood plasma, with antibodies against it, for experimental treatment or research purposes.

Díaz-Balart is Roman Catholic.

See also
 List of Hispanic and Latino Americans in the United States Congress

References

External links

 Congressman Mario Díaz-Balart official U.S. House website
 Mario Díaz-Balart campaign website
 
 
 
 Mario Díaz-Balart at PolitiFact Florida
 

|-

|-

|-

|-

|-

|-

|-

|-

<ref>

1961 births
21st-century American politicians
American Roman Catholics
American politicians of Cuban descent
Catholics from Florida
Mario
Republican Party Florida state senators
Hispanic and Latino American state legislators in Florida
Hispanic and Latino American members of the United States Congress
Living people
Republican Party members of the Florida House of Representatives
Politicians from Fort Lauderdale, Florida
Politicians from Miami
Republican Party members of the United States House of Representatives from Florida
University of South Florida alumni
Latino conservatism in the United States